Two ships of the Royal Navy have borne the name HMS Prince William:

  was a 4-gun flyboat captured in 1665 and captured again by the Dutch in 1666.
  was a 64-gun third rate previously the Spanish ship Guispuscoano.  She was captured in 1780, converted to a sheer hulk in 1791 and was broken up in 1816.

A third vessel served the Royal Navy as HM hired armed ship .

Royal Navy ship names